The 2012–13 Israeli Women's Cup (Gvia HaMedina Nashim) was the 15th season of Israel's women's nationwide football cup competition.

The competition was won by Maccabi Holon who had beaten F.C. Ramat HaSharon 2–0 in the final.

The Second Division League Cup was won by F.C. Kiryat Gat, who had beaten Bnot Tiv’on 4–0 in the final.

Results

Quarter-finals

Semi-finals

Final

Gvia Ligat Nashim Shniya

Format
As the second division had 8 clubs for this season, the competition was played as a strait knock-out competition.

Quarter-finals

Semi-finals

Final

References

External links
2012–13 State Cup Women Israeli Football Association 
2012–13 Ligat Nashim Shniya Cup Israeli Football Association 

Israel Women's Cup seasons
cup
Israel